The Krásna Hôrka Castle is a castle in Slovakia, built on a hilltop overlooking the village of Krásnohorské Podhradie near Rožňava, in Košice Region. The first recorded mention of the castle was in 1333. In 1961 Krásna Hôrka was designated a National Cultural Monument of the Slovak Republic. It was said to be one of the country's best-preserved
castles. On 10 March 2012 the castle was extensively damaged by fire, due to some teens carelessly discarding a cigarette which set the grass on fire.

Etymology
The name means "a beautiful mountain" ( - beautiful, hôrka - a little mountain).
 Unlikely but possible is a derivation from the word kras (karst), because the karst is in the neighbourhood.

History
The castle was built in the 13th century by the Hungarian Ákos brothers on a trade route leading from Transylvania through Košice to Spiš and today's Poland. The Ákos family (which later changed its name to Bebek) lived in Krásna Hôrka from the mid-13th century to 1566, apart from a short period when the Mariássy family seized control of the castle. In 1578 the castle passed into the hands of [the Hungarian] Péter Andrássy and remained in the possession of the Andrássy family up until 1918 (the year the First Czechoslovak Republic was founded).

During 2010 and 2011 the castle underwent renovation and was re-opened to public in April, 2011.

2012 fire
On 10 March 2012, the castle was badly damaged by fire. The fire was caused by two young gypsy boys who attempted to light up a cigarette and accidentally lit grass on the hill, from where it spread to the castle.

The castle building suffered extensive damage. The roof, the exhibition area in the Gothic palace and the bell tower were completely destroyed. Three bells in the bell tower were melted by the heat. Initially, it was thought that many of the building's historic artefacts had been destroyed. However, according to the Interior Minister of Slovakia Daniel Lipšic, "...the vast majority of exhibits remained undamaged". Daniel Krajcer, Minister of Culture, commented that only the upper part of the castle (including collections) had been destroyed. The Slovak National Museum has stated that 90% of the collections were undamaged.

Cultural references
Hungarian folk ballad Krasznahorka büszke vára (The Proud Castle of Krásna Hôrka), traditionally played on a tárogató, is inspired by the castle.

Gallery

Notes

References

External links

Krásna Hôrka Castle

Castles in Slovakia
13th-century architecture in Slovakia
Andrássy family
Museums in Košice Region
History museums in Slovakia
Buildings and structures in Košice Region
Tourist attractions in Košice Region
Historic house museums in Europe